Cerro El Sol, also known as Wei- or Uei-tepui, is a small tepui in Bolívar state, Venezuela. It is situated off the northern flank of Auyán-tepui, just northwest of the similarly small Cerro La Luna, and forms part of the Auyán Massif. Both it and Cerro La Luna emerge near the end of a long forested ridge leading from Auyán-tepui.

See also
 Distribution of Heliamphora

References

Tepuis of Venezuela
Mountains of Venezuela
Mountains of Bolívar (state)